The Tyger River is a stream in the U.S. state of South Carolina, and a tributary of the Broad River. It is part of the Santee River Basin. It is a generally shallow and narrow river. Pollution in the north fork was the source of dispute in Friends of the Earth, Inc. v. Laidlaw Environmental Services, Inc.

Etymology 
There are several theories to how the river got its name. A local legend says the river got its name for its "tiger-like" current. Another legend states that it was named after a french explorer named Tygert. One legend states that a wild cat and bear fought on the riverbank, with the wild cat winning. The Cherokee called the river Amoyescheck.

According to the Geographic Names Information System, variant names for the river are:

A Moyes Chek

Tiger River

Tygar River

Course 
The Tyger River starts as three forks in Spartanburg County, in upstate South Carolina, the north, middle, and south Tyger Rivers. The rivers flow generally southeastward until joining near Woodruff. The river continues flowing southeast until becoming the border for Union and Newberry Counties, while flowing 26 miles through Sumter National Forest. The river continues until joining the Broad River north of the Parr Reservoir. This point is the tri-point between Newberry, Union, and Fairfield Counties.

Via the Broad River, the Tyger River is part of the Santee River Basin.

Crossings

Spartanburg County 
 - Crosses South River

 - Crosses South and Middle forks

 - Crosses South Fork

 - Crosses all 3 forks

 - Crosses North and South Forks

Union County

See also
List of rivers of South Carolina

References

Rivers of Fairfield County, South Carolina
Rivers of Newberry County, South Carolina
Rivers of Spartanburg County, South Carolina
Rivers of Union County, South Carolina
Rivers of South Carolina